Laurette A. J. Onkelinx (born 2 October 1958) is a Belgian politician from the Francophone Socialist Party. She was the Deputy Prime Minister – Minister of Social Affairs and Public Health in the Belgian federal government, i.e., the Di Rupo Government, which took office on 6 December 2011.

Biography
At the age of 30 she was elected to the Belgian Chamber of Representatives.

Her father, Gaston Onkelinx, originally a Dutch-speaking migrant from Flemish Limburg to francophone Wallonia, has long been mayor of Seraing (near Liège) and member of the House of Representatives (1974–1987). Her grandfather, Maurice Onkelinx, was alderman and mayor of Jeuk in Limburg and lost his civil rights for some years after the Second World War. Her older brother, Alain Onkelinx, has been a member of the Regional Parliament of Wallonia since September 2005. She speaks French and Dutch.

Controversy

When Turkish terrorist Fehriye Erdal was sentenced to four years imprisonment by a Bruges court on 28 February 2006, it turned out that she had shaken off the Belgian secret service, which had the responsibility of following her since 23 February 2006 (Erdal had been under house arrest since 2000, and living in the same building as the DHKP-C secretariat). Both Laurette Onkelinx and Minister of the Interior Patrick Dewael came under fire for this incident; the Christian Democratic and Flemish party (CD&V) and Vlaams Belang demanded the resignation of both of them on 6 March 2006.

In July 2006, Onkelinx came under heavy political fire again when one of Belgian's most notorious criminals, Murat Kaplan, did not return from a weekend-leave, which she had signed off. In August 2006 she came again under heavy fire when 28 prisoners managed to escape from a prison in Dendermonde. In September 2006, it was reported that the criminal Victor Hoxha had returned to Belgium – he had been deported from Belgium earlier in 2006, and told not to return for ten years. Prime minister Guy Verhofstadt, of the Flemish Liberals and Democrats (VLD), asked the minister to refrain from releasing any criminals prematurely in the coming three months, but she refused this demand. This came just before the government was to prepare its budget for the coming year, and the October municipal elections.

CD&V and Vlaams Belang again called for the resignation of the minister, but it was unknown how far the VLD would go in supporting the minister (and accordingly, the then current federal government). On 23 September, it was reported that another criminal did not return from day-leave. Tony Van Parys, of the CD&V party, called it "incomprehensible that someone like Azzouzi [the criminal in question] would get penitentiary leave." The cabinet's crisis was averted the next week, when a deal was struck between the VLD and PS, allowing criminals only to be released on parole, in the next months, after consent by their victim (or the victim's family).

On 6 October, two days before the Belgian municipal elections, Laurette Onkelinx was hit with a pie at an election event in Schaerbeek. The perpetrator was Benito Franscesconi, a 78-year-old man, who has a history of "civil disobedience." Franscesconi has made himself a civil party to many court cases in which he had no direct interest.

First married to Abbès Guenned, a Belgian of Moroccan descent, Onkelinx divorced him in 1997–1998; Morocco asked for Guenned's extradition, accusing him of drug trafficking (he was stopped on 31 July 1997 at Zaventem airport, while in possession of a diplomatic passport), a charge which was later dropped. He was also arrested in Turkey, but released after strong influence from the Belgian government. At that time, Onkelinx was presiding over the government of Belgium's French Community. Onkelinx then married barrister . Witnesses to this marriage were both their former husband and wife. In 2003, Guenned became an adviser to Onkelinx' cabinet, charged with the preparation of the election of the Belgian advisory Muslim council, and dealing with town management but, especially, with communication between the cabinet and the Islamic associations.

In 2009, Onkelinx criticized Pope Benedict XVI over his comments that the distribution of condoms without prior education only worsened the AIDS crisis.

In 2014, it was revealed that her Ministry had hired the firm of her own husband, as a legal consultant, at a cost of 245,000 euros.

On 13 September 2017, Onkelincx announced she would not be a candidate for the 2019 elections.

Political career
First elected to the Belgian House of Representatives in 1988, she held several ministerial posts without any interruption from 1992 until 2014:

Minister of Social Integration, Public Health and Environment (1992–1993)
Minister-President and Minister of the Civil Service, Child Healthcare and Promotion of Health in the French Community (1993–1995)
Minister-President and Minister of Education, Media, Youth, Child Healthcare and Promotion of Health in the French Community (1995–1999)
Deputy Prime Minister and Minister of Labour (1999–2003)
Deputy Prime Minister and Minister of Labour and Transport (2003)
Deputy Prime Minister and Minister of Justice (July 2003 – December 2007)
Minister of Social Affairs and Public Health (December 2007 – October 2014)

References and sources

External links

|-

|-

|-

|-

|-

|-

1958 births
Living people
20th-century Belgian lawyers
20th-century women lawyers
21st-century Belgian women politicians
21st-century Belgian politicians
Belgian women lawyers
Belgian Ministers of Justice
Environment ministers
Female justice ministers
Grand Crosses of the Order of the Crown (Belgium)
Health ministers of Belgium
Labour ministers of Belgium
Members of the Chamber of Representatives (Belgium)
Ministers-President of the French Community of Belgium
Socialist Party (Belgium) politicians
People from Seraing
Social affairs ministers
Transport ministers of Belgium
University of Liège alumni
Women government ministers of Belgium
Women governors and heads of sub-national entities